Brenda K. Starr is the eponymous second album and major label debut by Brenda K. Starr.

Release

Released in 1987. It produced the singles "Breakfast In Bed", "I Still Believe", and "What You See Is What You Get". The album was reissued as a Japanese import title with bonus tracks on February 24, 1999 in the United States.

Track listing

Personnel
Credits for Brenda K. Starr adapted from Allmusic

Steve Allen- executive producer
Antonina Armato- composer
Jocelyn Brown- vocals (background)
Vivian Cherry- vocals (background)
Mariah Carey- vocals (background)
Deodato- producer
Tommy Faragher- composer, producer
Lotti Golden- composer, producer
Connie Harvey- vocals (background)
Kate Hyman- executive producer
Jellybean- mixing
Curtis Rance King, Jr.- vocals (background)
Jim Klein- composer, songwriter
Jerry Knight- composer

Stephen Broughton Lunt- composer, producer
John Morales- arranger, producer
Sergio Munzibai- producer
John Robie- producer
Arnie Roman- composer
Peggy Sendars- composer
Davitt Sigerson- composer
Brenda K. Starr- composer, primary artist
Arthur Stead- composer
Janet Wright- vocals (background)
Fred Zarr- mixing
Lance McVickar-recording engineer, mixing

Charts

Singles

References

External links
 Brenda K. Starr-Brenda K. Starr at Discogs

1987 albums
MCA Records albums
Brenda K. Starr albums